

This is a timeline of the history of the area in present-day South Africa.

History of South Africa
Wikipedia timelines
South African timelines
South Africa